Elections were held in Illinois on Tuesday, November 5, 1946.

Primaries were held April 9, 1946.

Election information
1946 was a midterm election year in the United States.

Turnout
In the primary election 1,531,657 ballots were cast (741,821 Democratic and 789,836 Republican).

In the general election 3,619,332 ballots were cast.

Federal elections

United States House 

All 26 Illinois seats in the United States House of Representatives were up for election in 1946.

Republicans flipped five Republican-held seats, leaving the Illinois House delegation to consist of 20 Republicans and 6 Democrats.

State elections

Treasurer 

Incumbent first-term Treasurer, Republican Conrad F. Becker, did not seek reelection. Republican Richard Yates Rowe was elected to succeed him.

Democratic primary

Republican primary

General election

Superintendent of Public Instruction 

Incumbent  Superintendent of Public Instruction Vernon L. Nickell, a Republican, was reelected to a second term.

Democratic primary

Republican primary

General election

State Senate
Seats in the Illinois Senate were up for election in 1946. Republicans retained control of the chamber.

State House of Representatives
Seats in the Illinois House of Representatives were up for election in 1946. Republicans retained control of the chamber.

Trustees of University of Illinois

An election was held for three of nine seats for Trustees of University of Illinois. Republicans won all three seats. However, since all three seats up for election were already held by Republicans, this did not change the partisan composition of the University of Illinois Board of Trustees, with the board's 9–3 Republican majority over Democrats being retained.

First-term Republican incumbents Park Livingston and John R. Fornof were reelected. New Republican member Doris Simpson Holt was elected. Third-term Republican incumbent Helen M. L. Grigsby was not renominated.

Judicial elections
On June 3, 1946 elections were held to fill vacancies on the Superior Court of Cook County. On November 5, 1946, a special election was held to fill a vacancy on the Circuit Court of Cook County. On December 17, 1946, a special election was held to fill a vacancy on the Sixth Judicial Circuit.

Ballot measures
Two measures was put before voters in 1946.

Illinois Gateway Amendment
The Illinois Gateway Amendment, a proposed amendment to Section 2 of Article XIV of the Constitution, failed to meet the threshold for approval.

If approved, this amendment would have enabled the legislature to submit legislatively referred amendments to up to three constitutional articles per session.

In order to be approved, legislatively referred constitutional amendments required approval equal to a majority of voters voting in the entire general election.

World War II Veterans' Compensation Act
The World War II Veterans' Compensation Act, a legislatively referred bond issue, was approved by voters.

The bond issue would be used to compensate veterans of World War II.

It was required to be approved by a vote equal to vote for whichever chamber of the state legislature received the greatest vote total. In this case, that meant it needed to receive 1,709,721 votes.

Local elections
Local elections were held. These included county elections, such as the Cook County elections.

References

 
Illinois